Tipiṭakadhara Dhammabhaṇḍāgārika is an honorific Burmese Buddhist title conferred by the government of Myanmar to the Buddhist monks who have passed five years since completing all levels of Tipitakadhara Tipitakakovida Selection Examinations in accordance with the provision No. 37/2010 of the State Peace and Development Council. The awardees are annually announced on 4 January, the Independence Day of Myanmar.

Qualifications
According to the section 6 (A) of the Provisions on the Religious Titles promulgated on 17 June 2015, a recipient must meet the following qualifications:
 Have been conferred the title of Tipitakadhara for his memorization the Tipitaka
 Have been conferred the title of Tipitakakovida for being able to deal with difficult matters on Tipitaka
 Five years had passed since the title of Tpitakadhara Tipitakakovida have been conferred
 Be fully endowed with morality, fairness and wisdom

Recipients
As of 2022, there are 13 sayadaws who have been offered the title.

 Ashin Vicittasārābhivaṃsa
 Ashin Neminda
 Ashin Kosalla
 Ashin Sumaṅgalālaṅkāra
 Ashin Sīrindābhivaṃsa
 Ashin Vāyāmindābhivaṃsa
 Ashin Sīlakkhandhābhivaṃsa
 Ashin Vaṃsapālālaṅkāra
 Ashin Gandhamālālaṅkāra
 Ashin Sunada
 Ashin Indapāla
 Ashin Abhijātābhivaṃsa
 Ashin Indācariya

References

Burmese Buddhist titles